RTC may refer to:

Places in the United States
 Redmond Town Center, Washington
 Reston Town Center, Virginia

Education and training
 Recruit Training Command, Great Lakes, Illinois
 Reformed Theological College, Australia
 Regional Technical College, former name of Institutes of Technology in Ireland
 Renton Technical College, also known as Renton Tech, an American public two-year institution
 Royal Thimphu College, the first private university in Bhutan

Organisations and enterprises

 RTC (Cape Verde), also known as Radiotelevisão Caboverdiana, Cape Verde's state-owned radio and television station
 RTC (record label), New Zealand record label
 Dirección General de Radio, Televisión y Cinematografía, a Mexican government agency
 Religious Technology Center, the corporate body that controls the intellectual property of the Church of Scientology
 Residential treatment center, a live-in health care facility for adolescents with severe psychological, behavioral, and/or substance abuse issues
 Resolution Trust Corporation, the government-owned company created to manage insolvent financial institutions during the US savings and loan crisis
 Rochester Telephone Company (disambiguation), several telephone companies in the United States
 Rotterdam Terror Corps, a Dutch gabber group
 Radiotechnique-Coprim, a French electronics company
 Rational Team Concert, an IBM software engineering solution

Technology
 Real-time clock, the clock that keeps civil time for a computer 
 Real-time communication, any mode of telecommunications in which all users can exchange information instantly or with negligible delay
 Real-time computing

Transport
 Rail traffic controller, a person who oversees the movement of trains and controls railway signals
 Rails-to-Trails Conservancy, a US organization to promote use of railroad rights-of-way as trails
 Railway Technical Centre, the British Rail research centre in Derby, England
 Regional Transportation Commission of Southern Nevada, a government agency responsible for public transit and roads in the Las Vegas valley, parent of RTC Transit (formerly called Citizens Area Transit)
 Regional Transportation Commission of Washoe County, a government agency responsible for public transit and roads in and around the cities of Reno and Sparks, in Western Nevada
 Réseau de transport de la Capitale, the regional transportation commission for Quebec City
 Road traffic collision, or road traffic accident
 Road Transport Corporation, see :Category:State road transport corporations of India
 Rochester Transit Corporation, historical operator of streetcar, rail, and bus transit in Rochester, New York.

Other uses
 Regional Trial Court, the highest trial courts in the Philippines
 Right to Censor, a group in the World Wrestling Federation
 Rosette terminal complex, a structure in vascular plants which produces cellulose
 Replication and transcription complex, the most vulnerable part of a coronavirus

See also
 RCT (disambiguation)